Habibur Rahman (4 February 1931 – 11 May 2002) was a Bangladesh Nationalist Party politician and the member of parliament for Bogra-7 and Bogra-1.

Birth and early life 
Habibur Rahman was born in Bogra District.

Career 
Habibur Rahman was elected to parliament from Bogra-7 as a Bangladesh Nationalist Party candidate in 1979. He was elected to parliament from Bogra-1 as a Bangladesh Nationalist Party candidate in 1991, February 1996 and June 1996. He was a Member of the 3rd National Assembly of Pakistan representing Bogra-II.

Death 
Habibur Rahman died on 11 May 2002.

See also 
 Jatiya Sangsad

References

External links 
 List of 5th Parliament Members -Jatiya Sangsad (In Bangla)
 List of 6th Parliament Members -Jatiya Sangsad (In Bangla)
 List of 7th Parliament Members -Jatiya Sangsad (In Bangla)

1931 births
2002 deaths
People from Bogra District
Bangladesh Nationalist Party politicians
2nd Jatiya Sangsad members
5th Jatiya Sangsad members
6th Jatiya Sangsad members
7th Jatiya Sangsad members
Pakistani MNAs 1962–1965